Étienne-Louis-Charles-Alexandre Michon (23 March 1865 in Marly-sous-Issy – 2 January 1939) was a French art historian.

Biography 
The son of :fr:Joseph Michon, Étienne Michon was a student at the École normale supérieure from 1884 to 1886 and agrégé de lettres. He was a member of the École française de Rome from 1887 to 1889, and worked at the Louvre from 1889 to 1899.

Étienne Michon was assistant curator at the Louvre from 1899 to 1919, professor at the École du Louvre from 1910 to 1931, chief curator at the Louvre from 1919 to 1936, co-director of the magazine Monuments et mémoires de la fondation Eugène Piot from 1929 to 1939 and honorary curator of national museums in 1936.

He became a member of the Société des Antiquaires de France in 1895 and was elected at the Académie des Inscriptions et Belles-Lettres in 1925.

He was officier of the Légion d'honneur, officier d'Académie and officier de l'Instruction publique.

Some publications 
 Musée du Louvre. Département des antiquités grecques et romaines. – Acquisitions de l'année 1906. Éd. Antoine Héron de Villefosse et Étienne Michon. Paris : s. n., 1907.
 Musée du Louvre. Département des antiquités grecques et romaines. – Catalogue sommaire des marbres antiques. Éd. Antoine Héron de Villefosse et Étienne Michon. Paris : s. n., 1896 ; Paris : G. Braun, 1918 ; Melun : imprimerie Administrative ; Paris : Musées nationaux, palais du Louvre, 1922.
 La Sculpture grecque au musée du Louvre. Paris : L'Illustration, 1934 (« Les Albums du Louvre »).
 La Sculpture romaine au musée du Louvre, Paris : L'Illustration, 1936 (« Les Albums du Louvre »).

Sources 
 Charles Picard, Éloge funèbre de M. Etienne Michon, membre ordinaire, 1939

External links 
 Étienne Michon on data.bnf.fr
 Notice  Étienne Michon, Hélène Le Meaux, INHA, 2010
 Notice sur la vie et les travaux de M. Étienne Michon on Persée

1865 births
People from Saône-et-Loire
1939 deaths
École Normale Supérieure alumni
French hellenists
French art historians
French epigraphers
Officiers of the Légion d'honneur
Members of the Académie des Inscriptions et Belles-Lettres